Pola Buckley is an American accountant and the 20th Maine State Auditor. A Democrat, she was elected by the Maine Legislature to her position on January 7, 2013 serving until January, 2021, when she was succeeded by Matthew Dunlapand then Jacob Norton shortly after.

Buckley earned a Bachelor of Science degree in accounting from Boston College and a master's degree in Business Administration from Thomas College.

References

Year of birth missing (living people)
Living people
Maine State Auditors
Women state constitutional officers of Maine
Maine Democrats
Carroll School of Management alumni
Thomas College alumni
American accountants
Women accountants
21st-century American women